The Attepe mine is a large mine in the south of Turkey in Niğde Province  south of the capital, Ankara. Attepe represents the largest iron reserve in Turkey, having estimated reserves of 70 million tonnes of ore grading 40% iron. The 70 million tonnes of ore contains 28 million tonnes of iron metal.

References

External links 
 Official site

Iron mines in Turkey
Buildings and structures in Niğde Province